Maharaja Nandakumar (also known as Nuncomar) (1705 – died 5 August 1775), was an Indian tax collector for various regions in what is modern-day West Bengal. Nanda Kumar was born at Bhadrapur, which is now in Birbhum. He was the first Indian to be executed by hanging. Nandakumar was appointed by the East India Company to be the Dewan (tax collector) for Burdwan, Nadia and Hooghly in 1764, following the removal of Warren Hastings from the post.
 
In 1773, when Hastings was reinstated as governor-general of Bengal, Nandakumar brought accusations against him of accepting or giving bribes that were entertained by Sir Philip Francis and the other members of the Supreme Council of Bengal. However, Hastings overruled the council's charges. Thereafter, in 1775, he brought charges of document forgery against Nandakumar. The Maharaja was tried under Elijah Impey, India's first Chief Justice, and friend of Warren Hastings, was found guilty, and hanged in Kolkata on 5 August 1775.

Later Hastings, along with Sir Elijah Impey, the chief justice, was impeached by the British Parliament. They were accused by Burke (and later by Macaulay) of committing judicial murder.

Early life
Nandkumar was born in a Brahmin family. He held posts under Nawab of Bengal. After the Battle of Plassey, he was recommended to Robert Clive for appointment as their agent to collect revenues of Burdwan, Nadia and Hooghly. The title "Maharaja" was conferred on Nandakumar by Shah Alam II in 1764. He was appointed Collector of Burdwan, Nadia, and Hugli by the East India Company in 1764, in place of Warren Hastings. He learnt Vaishnavism from Radhamohana Thakura.

Charges against Hastings
Maharaja Nandakumar accused Hastings of bribing him with more than one-third of a million rupees and claimed that he had proof against Hastings in the form of a letter.

Hanging

Warren Hastings was then with the East India Company and happened to be a school friend of Sir Elijah Impey. Some historians are of the opinion that Maharaja Nandakumar was falsely charged with forgery and Sir Elijah Impey, the first Chief Justice of Supreme Court in Calcutta, gave a false judgement to hang Nandakumar.  Nandakumar's hanging has been termed a judicial murder by certain historians. Macaulay also accused both men of conspiring to commit a judicial murder. Maharaja Nandakumar was hanged at Calcutta, near present-day Vidyasagar Setu, on 5 August 1775. During that period the punishment for forgery was hanging (as mandated by the Forgery Act 1728 passed by the British parliament), although some legal scholars have said that the law was only applicable in Britain and not British territories in India.

Books 
 Sir James Stephen, The story of Nuncomar and the impeachment of Sir Elijah Impey (2 vols., 1885)

Legacy
 A school in his honor, Bhadrapur Maharaja Nanda Kumar High School, was established on his birthplace at Bhadrapur village on Birbhum District. 
 A temple was established by him on Akalipur Village near Bhadrapur village. The temple was built for Hindu deity Ma Kaali.This is a very popular temple and thousands of visitors came by. It is situated near the banks of the Brahmani River.
 A college in his honor, Maharaja Nandakumar Vidyalaya, was established in purba medinipur in 2007, and the college is affiliated with Vidyasagar University.
 A road in Baranagar, Kolkata is named Maharaja Nandakumar Road.
 Nandakumar is also the name of a locality in the West Bengal district of East Midnapur.
  was established in Tamluk–Digha branch line of Kharagpur railway division.

In popular culture

Films and television
In 1988, Doordarshan Serial  Bharat Ek Khoj produced and directed by Shyam Benegal also picturised a full one episode on the Company Bahadur. In that titular role of Maharaja Nandakumar was played by noted television actor Rajendra Gupta.

External links
The story of Nuncomar and the impeachment of Sir Elijah Impey Cornell University Library Historical Monographs Collection.  {Reprinted by} Cornell University Library Digital Collections
 
 Charges against Sir Elijah Impey

References

People executed for forgery
Executed Indian people
People executed by British India by hanging
1775 deaths
Year of birth unknown
Year of birth uncertain